The 1997 South Australian state election was held on 11 October 1997.

Retiring Members

Labor
Frank Blevins MHA (Giles)
John Quirke MHA (Playford)
Anne Levy MLC

Liberal
Harold Allison MHA (Gordon)
Stephen Baker MHA (Waite)
Heini Becker MHA (Peake)
Peter Dunn MLC

House of Assembly
Sitting members are shown in bold text. Successful candidates are highlighted in the relevant colour. Where there is possible confusion, an asterisk (*) is also used.

Legislative Council
Sitting members are shown in bold text. Tickets that elected at least one MLC are highlighted in the relevant colour. Successful candidates are identified by an asterisk (*). Eleven seats were up for election. Labor were defending five seats. The Liberals were defending five seats. The Democrats were defending one seat.

References
Statistical Returns: General Elections, 11 October 1997 (State Electoral Office of South Australia).

Candidates for South Australian state elections
1990s in South Australia
1997 elections in Australia